2007 Continental Championships may refer to:

African Championships
 Multisport: 2007 All-Africa Games

Asian Championships
 Athletics: 2007 Asian Athletics Championships
 Baseball: 2007 Asian Baseball Championship
 Football (soccer): 2007 AFC Asian Cup
 Football (soccer): 2007 AFC Champions League
 Multisport: 2007 Asian Indoor Games
 Multisport: 2007 Asian Winter Games
 Weightlifting: 2007 Asian Weightlifting Championships

European Championships
 Artistic gymnastics: 2007 European Artistic Gymnastics Championships
 Athletics: 2007 European Indoor Championships in Athletics
 Basketball: EuroBasket 2007
 Figure skating: 2007 European Figure Skating Championships
 Football (soccer): 2006–07 UEFA Champions League
 Football (soccer): 2006–07 UEFA Cup
 Football (soccer): 2007 UEFA European Under-17 Championship
 Football (soccer): 2006–07 UEFA Women's Cup
 Futsal: 2007 UEFA Futsal Championship
 2007 European Rowing Championships
 Show jumping: 2007 European Show Jumping Championship
 Volleyball: 2006–07 CEV Champions League
 Volleyball: 2006–07 Women's CEV Champions League

Oceanian Championships
 Football (soccer): 2007 OFC Champions League
 Football (soccer): 2007 OFC Women's Championship

Pan American Championships / North American Championships
 Football (soccer): 2007 Caribbean Cup
 Football (soccer): 2007 CONCACAF Champions' Cup
 Football (soccer): 2007 CONCACAF Gold Cup
 Multisport: 2007 Pan American Games

South American Championships
 Athletics: 2007 South American Championships in Athletics
 Football (soccer): 2007 Copa América

See also
 2007 World Championships (disambiguation)
 2007 World Junior Championships (disambiguation)
 2007 World Cup (disambiguation)
 Continental championship (disambiguation)

Continental championships